Blackbutt is a southern suburb of  Shellharbour, New South Wales, Australia.  The eastern half of the suburb is occupied by the Blackbutt Forest Reserve. The suburb was named after the blackbutt tree, Eucalyptus pilularis.

References

Suburbs of Wollongong
City of Shellharbour